Periodic elections for the Tasmanian Legislative Council were held on 3 May 2008. The two seats up for election were Huon, held by independent MLC Paul Harriss, and Rosevears, held by independent MLC Kerry Finch. These seats were last contested in 2002.

Huon
Independent MLC Paul Harriss had held Huon since 1996. A former Liberal Party member, there was speculation about his endorsement as a federal Liberal candidate for the federal seat of Franklin in the 2007 federal election, but this did not eventuate. His only opponent was Huon Valley councillor Mark Rickards, an endorsed candidate of the Tasmanian Greens, who focused his campaign on Harriss's support for the Gunns pulp mill.

Rosevears
Independent MLC Kerry Finch first won Rosevears in 2002, when it was a new seat. He was not opposed by the Tasmanian Greens, which was attributed to his opposition to the Gunns pulp mill and his generally socially liberal views. Like Harriss, he attracted only one challenger, in this case independent Colin O'Brien. O'Brien gave qualified support to the pulp mill.

References

2008 elections in Australia
Elections in Tasmania
2000s in Tasmania
May 2008 events in Australia